Commcare Pharmacy is a pharmacy with headquarters in Fort Lauderdale, Florida. The company was #374 on Inc. magazine's 2009 list of the fastest-growing private companies in America.

As a specialty pharmacy, Commcare has access to and dispenses restricted distribution products. These products are typically not available via other distribution channels (such as retail pharmacies) due to  FDA restrictions.

References

American companies established in 1996
Retail companies established in 1996
Companies based in Fort Lauderdale, Florida
Pharmacies of the United States
1996 establishments in Florida
Health care companies based in Florida